A Quarter Horse stallion, Billy Clegg (foaled 1932) was a sire during the early years of the American Quarter Horse Association (AQHA).

Life
Billy Clegg was registered as number 427 with the AQHA. His stud book entry gives his information as a bay stallion foaled in 1932, bred by Bernard Adams of Alfred, Texas and his owner at registration as Guy M. Troutman of Tucumcari, New Mexico. His sire was Paul El by Hickory Bill by Peter McCue and his dam was Bivarita by Billy Sunday.

During his breeding career, Billy Clegg sired two AQHA Race Register of Merit earners – Billy Big Enuf and Dust Storm. Nine of his daughters went on to produce Register of Merit earners. He sired on AQHA Champion, Billie B Fisher, and several Superior Performance horses, including Chickasha Mike. Twenty-nine of his daughters produced point earning show horses or racers. Billy Clegg died in 1958.

Billy Clegg was inducted into the AQHA Hall of Fame in 1998.

Pedigree

Notes

References

External links
 Billy Clegg at Quarter Horse Directory
 Billy Clegg at Quarter Horse Legends

American Quarter Horse sires
1932 animal births
AQHA Hall of Fame (horses)